Krishnabhaskar Mangalasserri (Malayalam : കൃഷ്ണഭാസ്ക്കർ മംഗലശ്ശേരി)is an Indian actor, Model, Academic, Novelist, and Screenwriter who works in the Malayalam film industry. He made his acting debut in the Malayalam film Puthiya Theerangal (2012) and later starred in the movie American-born Confused Desi (ABCD). He co-wrote and played a lead role in the movie Asha Black.

Early life and career
Krishnabhaskar was born in Kollam as the son of a police officer and school teacher in the year 1973. He was actively involved in school plays and drama.
After his MBA he started working in ad agencies in Chennai and then in Dubai.

He started modeling as one of his activities by facing the camera for brands like Musli power, Malayala Manorama, Sharon PVC pipes etc. He debuted into cinema with a cameo role in the Sathyan Anthikad film Puthiya Theerangal. Then came the film American-born Confused Desi (ABCD) directed by Martin Prakkat. He also acted in two short films – the yellow pen directed by Jude Anthany Joseph, and in the short film Scene contra.
He is also the global head of Aster Volunteers from december 2016 to december 2020 in the CSR and philanthropy department of Aster DM Healthcare Dubai.
He co wrote the Malayalam film Asha Black as a dialogue associate and also did a full-length role. He cofounded Digifaktory along with Sandeep varma and Gokulnath, a cinema marketing company in the year 2014. In 2019 he wrote and directed a short feature film Innaleyolam. 

In April 2016 he published his debut novel(April 2016) in Malayalam.

Filmography

As actor

As writer & director

References

External links
 
 

Indian male film actors
Living people
Malayalam screenwriters
Writers from Kollam
Male actors in Malayalam cinema
1973 births
21st-century Indian male actors
Male actors from Kollam